Lackanwood is a townland in County Westmeath, Ireland.

Lackanwood is one of 10 townlands of the civil parish of Lackan in the barony of Corkaree in the Province of Leinster.

The neighbouring townlands are: Clonkeen to the north, Clonava to the north–east, Lackan to the south–east, Ballyharney to the south–west, Hospitalbank to the west and Derradd to the north–west.

In the 1911 census of Ireland there were 10 houses and 49 inhabitants in the townland.

References

External links
Map of Lackanwood at openstreetmap.org
Lackanwood at the IreAtlas Townland Data Base
Lackanwood at Townlands.ie
 Lackanwood at Logainm.ie

Townlands of County Westmeath